Karl Heinrich Remigius Biscoe (28 June 1875 – 22 December 1948) better known as Charles Henry Biscoe was a German born British fencer, he competed mainly in the épée.

Biography
He competed at two Olympic Games. 

In 1924, he was selected to represent Great Britain at the 1924 Summer Olympics in Paris. He competed in both the individual épée event and the team épée event. Also in 1924, he won the épée title at the British Fencing Championships.

Four years later in 1928 he competed at his second Olympic Games when he took part in the individual épée event and the team épée event again.

References

External links
 

1875 births
1948 deaths
British male fencers
British expatriates in Germany
Olympic fencers of Great Britain
Fencers at the 1924 Summer Olympics
Fencers at the 1928 Summer Olympics
Sportspeople from Frankfurt